Curwood may refer to:

Curwood (surname), a surname
Mount Curwood, a mountain of Michigan, United States
Curwood Castle, a castle in Owosso, Michigan, United States

See also
Curwood Festival, a literary festival in the United States